Moon Machines is a Science Channel HD documentary miniseries consisting of six episodes documenting the engineering challenges of the Apollo program to land men on the Moon. It covers everything from the iconic Saturn V to the Command Module, the Lunar Module, the Space Suits, the Guidance and Control Computer, and the Lunar Rover. It was created by the team that made In the Shadow of the Moon in association with NASA to commemorate the agency's fiftieth anniversary in 2008. It first aired in June 2008 in the U.S. and UK, and was released on DVD a year later in June 2009.

Overview 
The miniseries features interviews with around 70 of the 400,000 engineers who worked on the Apollo program during the 1960s and early 1970s. These interviews are intercut with archive film, sourced by Footagevault from NASA's various film archives stored at the Johnson Space Center in Houston, Texas, the Glenn Research Center in Cleveland, Ohio, and from the National Archives in Washington.

The miniseries is narrated by actor Bill Hope.

Music 
The score was composed by Philip Sheppard.

Episodes

Part 1: The Saturn V Rocket 
The first episode of the series documents the creation of the iconic Saturn V rocket.

Part 2: The Command Module 
The second episode is centered on the construction of the Apollo Command Module and the setback of the Apollo 1 fire.

Part 3: The Navigation Computer 
The third episode details the story of MIT's work on the Apollo Guidance Computer.

Part 4: The Lunar Module 
The fourth episode features the Grumman project to build mankind's first true spacecraft, the Apollo Lunar Module.

Part 5: The Space Suit 
The penultimate episode focuses on the teams that created the remarkable Apollo pressure suit.

Part 6: The Lunar Rover 
The series' final episode centers on the design and perfection of the novel Lunar Roving Vehicle, carried to the Moon on the Apollo J-class missions.

Awards and nominations 
Part 2, the story of the Command Module, won a Grand REMI from the WorldFest-Houston International Film Festival in 2009

References

External links 
 

2008 American television series debuts
2008 American television series endings
American documentary television films
Documentary films about the space program of the United States
Films about the Apollo program
Science Channel original programming